Hossein Khatibi (born 5 January 1975 in Tabriz, East Azerbaijan) is a retired Iranian football player and assistant of Persian Gulf Pro League in the Tabrizian teams such as Tractor, Shahrdari and Machine Sazi. he was top goalscorers in the 1997–98 Azadegan League from  the Shahrdari football team. Rasoul Khatibi is his younger brother.

References

External links
 
 Hosein Khatibi in TeamMelli.com

Al-Nasr SC (Kuwait) players
Living people
1975 births
Iranian footballers
Shahrdari Tabriz players
Machine Sazi F.C. players
Iran international footballers
Tractor S.C. players
Pas players
Iranian football managers
Iranian expatriate footballers
Association football forwards
Sportspeople from Tabriz
Azadegan League players
Kuwait Premier League players
Expatriate footballers in Kuwait
Iranian expatriate sportspeople in Kuwait